Pachyodes is a genus of moths in the family Geometridae described by Achille Guenée in 1858.

Species
Pachyodes amplificata (Walker, 1862) (=Hypochroma abraxas Oberthür, 1913)
Pachyodes haemataria (Herrich-Schäffer, [1854]) (=Pachyodes almaria Guenée, [1858])
Pachyodes jianfengensis H.X.Han & D.Y.Xue, 2008
Pachyodes leucomelanaria Poujade, 1895
Pachyodes novata H.X.Han & D.Y.Xue, 2008
Pachyodes ornataria Moore, 1888
Pachyodes pratti (Prout, 1927)
Pachyodes subtrita (Prout, 1914)
Pachyodes subtrita subtrita (Prout, 1914)
Pachyodes subtrita simplicior (de Joannis, 1929)

References

External links

Pseudoterpnini
Geometridae genera
Moths described in 1858
Taxa named by Achille Guenée